Blattoidea is a superfamily of cockroaches and termites in the order Blattodea. There are about 17 families and more than 4,100 described species in Blattoidea.

The 12 families of termites are sometimes considered members of the suborder Isoptera, but recent phylogenetic analysis places them within the cockroach superfamily Blattoidea. Within Blattoidea, the termites are grouped under the epifamily Termitoidae.

The great coal deposits of the Carboniferous Period have been attributed in part to the lack of wood-consuming insects such as blattoids, which do not appear in the fossil record until the late Carboniferous.

Families
These 17 families belong to the superfamily Blattoidea:

Cockroaches
Epifamily Blattoidae
 Anaplectidae Walker, 1868
 Blattidae Latreille, 1810
 Lamproblattidae McKittrick, 1964
 Tryonicidae McKittrick & Mackerras, 1965

Epifamily Cryptocercoidae
 Cryptocercidae Handlirsch, 1925 (brown-hooded cockroaches)

Termites
Epifamily Termitoidae
 Archotermopsidae Engel et al., 2009 (rottenwood termites)
 Hodotermitidae Desneux, 1904
 Kalotermitidae Froggart, 1897 (drywood termites)
 Mastotermitidae Desneux 1904
 Rhinotermitidae Froggart, 1897 (subterranean termites)
 Serritermitidae Holmgren, 1910
 Stolotermitidae Holmgren, 1910
 Stylotermitidae Holmgren & Holmgren, 1917
 Termitidae Latreille, 1802 (higher termites)
 † Archeorhinotermitidae Krishna, 2003
 † Cratomastotermitidae Engel et al., 2009
 † Termopsidae Holmgren, 1911

References

Further reading

External links

 

Blattodea
Insect superfamilies